Cordano is a surname. Notable people with the surname include:

José Alberto Mujica Cordano (born 1935), Uruguayan politician
Roberta Cordano (born 1963), American university president
Rubén Cordano (born 1998), Bolivian footballer
Virgil Cordano (1919–2008), American Roman Catholic missionary

See also
Cordaro